Vietnam Idol, season 2 was the second season of Vietnam Idol. This season was co-produced by Đông Tây Promotion, and Ho Chi Minh City Television. It aired on 3 September 2008 on HTV7 Channel with one episode per week, later raised to 2 episodes following the semi-finals.

Trần Quốc Thiên from Thống Nhất, Đồng Nai Province was crowned as the winner of the competition. He received $10,000 cash, a recording contract with Music Faces and multiple commercial contracts.

Process
Following the success of the show, it was confirmed by producers that it would have Vietnam Idol air for a second season, but authorities subsequently postponed the contest until August.

The new season featured a different structure, with new host Sỹ Luân replacing Nguyên Vũ. The panel of judges was also changed, with new judges Hồ Hoài Anh and Trần Mạnh Tuấn joining Siu Black.

Audition Round
 Cần Thơ: 23 – 24 July 2008
 Hà Nội: 29 – 31 July 2008
 Đà Nẵng: 5 – 8 August 2008
 Hồ Chí Minh City: 14 – 16 August 2008

During the auditions, contestants were invited to perform the whole or part of a song to the producers, who decide whether they will perform to the judges. Unlike other Idol contests, the contestants are not notified immediately whether they will advance to the theater round by the judges, but must wait for the producers to contact them after the auditions. Unsuccessful contestants were not contacted.

Theater Round
The Theater Round involved the 94 contestants, who were invited to participate in Ho Chi Minh City in late August 2008. During this round, contestants were required to perform songs chosen by the producers of the contest.

Studio Round

From the 94 contestants, the Top 20 were chosen and placed into two groups according to gender. During a number of weeks, the two groups performed on alternating weeks, with viewers' votes ultimately deciding the Top 10.

List of the Top 20 below.

Top 10 contestants have been highlighted

Performance
Over the course of 8 weeks, the Top 10 contestants performed live. Each week the contestant with the least viewers' votes were eliminated from the contest. For the finals, "Vẫn hoài ước mơ" written by Đức Vượng was used as the exit song. The list below shows only the songs and the performances of the finalists.

Elimination chart

Grand Finale
The Grand Finale took place on 14 January 2009 at Hoa Binh Theatre. The Finale included a red carpet entrance and varied performances from the Top 10 contestants. The finale also included special performances from the winner of Vietnam Idol 2007 Phương Vy, Hà Hồ, Đàm Vĩnh Hưng, Quang Dũng and a notable collaboration between the three judges.
With 61% of votes, Trần Quốc Thiên was announced the winner of Vietnam Idol Season 2. Thanh Duy was runner-up with 39% of votes.

References

Vietnam Idol
2007 Vietnamese television seasons
2008 Vietnamese television seasons